Bhandasar Jain Temple or Bhanda Shah Jain temple, is a Jain temple located in Bikaner, Rajasthan. The temple is famous for wall painting and art work. This temple is protected by the Archaeological Survey of India.

History 
This temple was constructed by Bhandasa Oswal in the 12th century. The temple is dedicated to Sumatinatha, the 5th tirthankara. According to legends, 40,000 Kgs of ghee was used in the construction of this temple instead of water in a mortar.

Architecture 

Bhandasar Jain Temple is a three-storey temple, famous for its beautiful leaf paintings, frescoes and ornamented mirror work. This temple was constructed using red sandstone with beautiful paintings and yellow-stone carvings on walls, pillars of the sanctum and mandapa. On the walls there are illustrations depicting the lives of the 24 tirthankaras. The temple consist of garbhagriha, antarala, mahamandapa, and ardhamandapa. The sanctum is pancharatha (five rathas) is covered by shikhara having karna-amalakas and amalakas at top.

Gallery

Conservation 
The temple have undergone renovations, are under protection of Archaeological Survey of India.

See also 

 Jainism in Rajasthan

References

Citations

Sources 
  
 
 
 
 

Jain architecture
Jain art
12th-century Jain temples
Jain temples in Rajasthan
Buildings and structures in Bikaner